The Muro Saisei Kinenkan Museum is a museum in Kanazawa, Ishikawa Prefecture, Japan. The museum is about the Japanese poet Murō Saisei.

History
The museum was established on 1 August 2002.

Architecture
The museum building was built at the birthplace of Saisei.

Exhibitions
The museum exhibits Saisei's collections on his works, manuscripts and articles.

See also
 List of museums in Japan

References

External links

 

2002 establishments in Japan
Buildings and structures in Kanazawa, Ishikawa
Museums established in 2002
Museums in Ishikawa Prefecture
Poetry museums